Tegwen Malik (born 21 January 1975, in London) is a professional squash player who represented Wales. At 17, she was the youngest ever winner of the Welsh Senior Closed. She reached a career-high world ranking of World No. 16 in January 2000. She often competed in the top men's leagues in Wales and as the number one player in the Professional Bundelsleague in Germany. She was a well-respected player on the professional tour and was often admired for her athletic abilities on the court. 

During her career as an Elite Cymru Athlete she suffered a serious illness that many thought would end her professional career as an athlete. However, after nearly three years off the professional squash circuit she made an amazing recovery and clawed her world ranking back from last in the women’s world squash rankings to world number 16. Tegwen’s first tournament back on the professional circuit was the Washington Open (that was played in Seattle). Due to a long period off the squash circuit, she had to come through qualifying rounds to reach the main draw. She amazed those who thought it not possible to play at such a world level after being so unwell by winning the tournament final in straight sets to Latasha Khan (who reached a career high of world ranked 18). Tegwen subsequently went on to compete in the well respected Monte Carlo Classic, beating several top world ranked players to reach the semi finals. 

Tegwen has won several professional tournaments such as the Savcour Finnish Open, the Washington Open, Toulouse Open, Welsh Open and Iceland Open. During her glittering squash career she also represented Wales at the Commonwealth Games in Melbourne (singles and doubles), at world and European Team championships, home internationals and during different test series such as Wales verses South Africa. Tegwen often paired with Gavin Jones for mixed doubles events, winning a test series against the National Irish team in Belfast before going out to compete in the Melbourne 2006 Commonwealth games where they narrowly lost in the quarter finals to the Australian mixed doubles pair (Natalie Grinham and Joseph Kneipp) who went on to win the gold.

References 

Squash at the 2006 Commonwealth Games

http://www.squashplayer.co.uk/newspage.asp?Key=243

http://www.oocities.org/ruetpa/wispa99.htm

http://news.bbc.co.uk/sport1/hi/other_sports/squash/4173097.stm

External links 

1975 births
Living people
Sportspeople from London
Welsh female squash players